Workers' Party (PT) is an opposition Togolese political party founded in 1998. It is of Trotskyist orientation and has links to the trade unions. Claude Améganvi has been the PT's national coordinator since the party's founding. PT is a member of Pierre Lambert's International Liaison Committee for a Workers' International (ILC).

Communism in Togo
Political parties in Togo
Trotskyist organizations in Africa
Political parties established in 1998
1998 establishments in Togo